Daniel George Neumeier (born March 9, 1948) is a retired American professional baseball pitcher who appeared in three games in Major League Baseball, all in relief, for the  Chicago White Sox. Born in Shawano, Wisconsin, he graduated from Gresham High School and attended the University of Wisconsin at Oshkosh.

Neumeier's seven-year pro baseball career began when the White Sox selected him in the third round of the 1968 Major League Baseball Draft. Previously, he was drafted by the Washington Senators, but did not sign with them. Neumeier was recalled by Chicago after the 1972 minor-league season and worked a total of three innings, allowing three hits, three bases on balls and three earned runs. He did not get a decision or a save.

The following year, on December 4, he was traded to the Houston Astros for infielder Héctor Torres, and he split 1974 between the Triple-A affiliates of the Astros and San Diego Padres before leaving the game.

References

1948 births
Living people
Appleton Foxes players
Asheville Tourists players
Baseball players from Wisconsin
Chicago White Sox players
Denver Bears players
Duluth-Superior Dukes players
Hawaii Islanders players
Iowa Oaks players
Knoxville Sox players
Major League Baseball pitchers
Mobile White Sox players
People from Shawano, Wisconsin
Wisconsin–Oshkosh Titans baseball players